Padworth Common Local Nature Reserve is a   Local Nature Reserve on the edge of the hamlet of Padworth Common, between Reading and Newbury in Berkshire. It is owned by West Berkshire Council and managed by Berkshire, Buckinghamshire and Oxfordshire Wildlife Trust.

Geography and site
The site  is served by a network of paths that run through a variety of habitats, including heathland, woodland, ponds and wet alder-lined gullies. The woodland is based in the north of the site, with heathland in the south.

History

Padworth Common was given its nature reserve status in 2005 by Newbury District Council.

In 2013 the management of the nature reserve was transferred from West Berkshire Council to the Berkshire, Buckinghamshire and Oxfordshire Wildlife Trust.

Fauna

The site has the following fauna:

Reptiles and amphibians

Vipera berus
Grass snake
Anguis fragilis
Common frog
Common toad
Palmate newt
Smooth newt

Invertebrates

Grayling
Cicindela campestris
Bog bush-cricket
Golden-ringed dragonfly
Downy emerald
Common hawker
Purple hairstreak
Limenitis camilla

Birds

European nightjar
Dartford warbler
Tree pipit
European stonechat
Woodlark
European green woodpecker
Eurasian siskin
Goldcrest
Little grebe
Moorhen
Common buzzard
Woodcock
Tawny owl
Little owl
Eurasian treecreeper
Eurasian nuthatch
Hobby
Willow warbler
Garden warbler
Common whitethroat
Common chiffchaff
Eurasian blackcap
Common firecrest
Spotted flycatcher
Redwing
Fieldfare
Lesser redpoll

References

Parks and open spaces in Berkshire
Nature reserves in Berkshire
Local Nature Reserves in Berkshire
West Berkshire District
Berkshire, Buckinghamshire and Oxfordshire Wildlife Trust